Strantz is a German surname. Notable people with the surname include:

Hermann von Strantz (1853–1936), Prussian military officer
Louise Strantz (1823–1909), German composer, poet, and singer
Mike Strantz (1955–2005), American golf course architect

German-language surnames